Hidden Voices is an album by the Anthony Davis/James Newton Quartet recorded in 1979 for the India Navigation label.

Reception

Allmusic awarded the album 3 stars, stating: "The music is quite unpredictable and free in spots, yet does not neglect the use of melody and space. Thought-provoking performances".

Track listing
All compositions by Anthony Davis except as indicated
 "Forever Charles" (James Newton) - 5:35
 "Past Lives" - 9:10
 "Hocket in the Pocket" - 5:12
 "Crystal Texts Set I, Pre-A Reflection" (Newton) - 12:51
 "Sudden Death" - 10:04

Personnel 
 Anthony Davis - piano
 James Newton - flute
 George Lewis - trombone
 Rick Rozie - bass
 Pheeroan akLaff - drums

References 

1979 albums
Anthony Davis (composer) albums
James Newton albums
India Navigation albums